The Swedish State Railways class E10 was a type of steam locomotive which was used for freight traffic. Ten locomotives were built in 1947 as a slightly modified version of the older E9 class. They were used mainly on the Inland Line, before being placed in the strategic reserve, where some remained until 1990; five of them have been preserved.

History 

In the 1940s the Swedish State Railways (SJ) saw a need for modern steam locomotives for freight traffic on the Inland Line and in southern Norrland. When the private railway company Halmstad–Nässjö Järnväg (HNJ) was nationalized in 1945, their G12 class three-cylinder 4-8-0 locomotives became the E9 class of SJ. Impressed by these smooth-running locomotives with high traction and a low axle load, SJ ordered ten E10 locomotives from NOHAB, based on the E9. 

The E10 locomotives, delivered in 1947, were the last large steam locomotives built for the Swedish railways. The class differed from the E9 by having roller bearings, fully enclosed cabs, and slightly different fireboxes. They were given tenders of the G5 type, a six-wheeled semi-Vanderbilt tender originally designed for the Gb class locomotives in 1920, and large smoke deflectors of the German Wagner type.

The type was mainly used on the Mora–Östersund section of the Inland Line and other railways in the Dalarna region. They were converted to oil firing in the 1950s, but this was not very successful, and some locomotives were damaged in fires related to it.

As the use of steam locomotives declined in Sweden, a large number of surplus locomotives were preserved in the strategic reserve (Swedish: Beredskapslok) to replace diesel-powered vehicles in case the import of oil was interrupted. The E10 class was allocated to the strategic reserve in the 1960s. It was one of only four types of steam locomotives to remain in the reserve past the 1970s, but four of the machines were withdrawn in 1973 and scrapped thereafter. The other six were part of the strategic reserve until 1990, and were later transferred to the Swedish Railway Museum and various preservation societies, although no. 1744 was used for spare parts and eventually scrapped in 2012.

References 

Railway locomotives introduced in 1947
Steam locomotives of Sweden
E10
4-8-0 locomotives
Freight locomotives
Standard gauge locomotives of Sweden